Boophis sambirano is a species of frog in the family Mantellidae.

It is endemic to Madagascar.
Its natural habitats are subtropical or tropical moist lowland forests, rivers, and degraded land that was previously forested.

Sources

sambirano
Endemic frogs of Madagascar
Amphibians described in 2005
Taxonomy articles created by Polbot